Stanley & Shek O is one of the 17 constituencies in the Southern District, Hong Kong.

The constituency returns one district councillor to the Southern District Council, with an election every four years.

Stanley & Shek O constituency has an estimated population of 22,258.

Councillors represented

Election results

2010s

Notes

References

Constituencies of Hong Kong
Constituencies of Southern District Council
1982 establishments in Hong Kong
Constituencies established in 1982
1994 establishments in Hong Kong
Constituencies established in 1994